Giard Township is a township in Clayton County, Iowa, USA.  As of the 2000 census, its population was 463.

History
Giard Township is named for Basil Giard.

Geography
According to the USGS, it contains three cemeteries: Council Hill, Railroad Employee and Saint Wenceslaus.

Transportation
Giard Township contains one airport, Monona Municipal Airport.

Notes

References
 USGS Geographic Names Information System (GNIS)

External links
 US-Counties.com
 City-Data.com

Townships in Clayton County, Iowa
Townships in Iowa